SS Comet may also refer to one of several commercial passenger steamships:
 , a paddle steamer built in 1811 in Port Glasgow that established the first successful commercial passenger service in Europe; wrecked in 1820 near Oban
 , a paddle steamer built in 1821 at Dumbarton in succession to the 1811 vessel; sank in a collision in 1825 with the loss of about 70 lives 
 , a steam packet built in Liverpool in 1825 and later renamed Lucifer; she was a hulk from 1875 
 , a wooden steamship built in 1857 in Cleveland, Ohio; carried cargo and passengers on the Great Lakes; wrecked 1875 in Lake Superior with a cargo of silver ore
 , an American steamboat in operation from 1871 to 1900 in the state of Washington

or one of several Type C2 ships built for the United States Maritime Commission:
  (MC hull number 33, Type C2), built by Federal Shipbuilding; transferred to the United States Navy as  USS Pollux (AKS-2); wrecked and lost in Newfoundland in 1942
  (MC hull number 125, Type C2-T), built by Tampa Shipbuilding; transferred to the United States Navy as  USS Shasta (AE-6); scrapped in 1972

References

Ship names